Shakir Jalali (ډاکټر شاکر جلالي) is the current acting governor of the Da Afghanistan Bank since 8 October 2021.

References

Year of birth missing (living people)
Living people
Governors of Da Afghanistan Bank
Central bankers